Hell's Heroes may refer to:

Hell's Heroes (film), a 1929 western
The Inglorious Bastards 2: Hell's Heroes, a 1987 Italian war film and the sequel to The Inglorious Bastards.
Hell's Heroes (book)